Washington Cotes was Dean of Lismore from 1747 until 1762; and Provost of Tuam from 1858 to 1862.

He was educated at Trinity College, Dublin.  His wife was born in 1722 and died in 1790.

References

Alumni of Trinity College Dublin
Deans of Lismore
1762 deaths
Provosts of Tuam